Brachiopterna katonae is a species of tephritid or fruit flies in the genus Brachiopterna of the family Tephritidae. Named after the Hungarian zoologist, Kalman Kittenberger's pseudonym, Katona.

Distribution
Tanzania.

References

Tephritinae
Insects described in 1924
Diptera of Africa
Taxa named by Mario Bezzi